The 56th Massachusetts General Court, consisting of the Massachusetts Senate and the Massachusetts House of Representatives, met in 1835 during the governorship of John Davis. Benjamin T. Pickman and George Bliss served as presidents of the Senate. Julius Rockwell served as speaker of the House.

Senators

Representatives

See also
 24th United States Congress
 List of Massachusetts General Courts

References

External links
 
 

Political history of Massachusetts
Massachusetts legislative sessions
massachusetts
1835 in Massachusetts